Garry Michael Monahan (born October 20, 1946) is a Canadian former professional hockey player who played 12 seasons in the National Hockey League. He was the first-ever draft pick in NHL history.

Career 
Monahan was selected first overall by the Montreal Canadiens in the 1963 NHL Amateur Draft of 16-year-old players—the first pick of the NHL's first draft. The next season, he played junior B hockey with the St. Michael's Buzzers in Toronto before moving up to the junior A Peterborough Petes in the Ontario Hockey Association, where he played from 1964 to 1967. In his final junior year, he turned into a top scorer playing on a line with Mickey Redmond, the league's leading goal scorer. Monahan scored 30 goals and 84 points in 47 games on what was otherwise a weak Petes team.

Montreal Canadiens 
He made his NHL debut with the Canadiens in the 1967–68 season, but spent most of the year with Montreal's Central Hockey League affiliate, the Houston Apollos. After spending almost the entire 1968–69 season in the American Hockey League with the Cleveland Barons, Monahan was traded to the Detroit Red Wings in June 1969 in the deal where the Canadiens acquired Pete Mahovlich. Monahan saw little ice time and struggled offensively and before the end of the season was traded to the Los Angeles Kings, where the story was the same. In 72 games with the Red Wings and Kings, Monahan scored just three goals and 10 points.

Toronto Maple Leafs 
Before the next season, Monahan was dealt to the Toronto Maple Leafs in the trade where the Kings acquired their future captain and coach, Bob Pulford. Monahan saw much more ice time in Toronto as a defensive forward, playing four full seasons with the Leafs. After the first game of the 1974–75 season, he was traded to the Vancouver Canucks and played there for four years, scoring his NHL career high of 18 goals and 44 points in the 1976–77 season. After his offensive numbers dropped off in his final year in Vancouver, Monahan rejoined the Leafs for the 1978–79 season, scoring just four goals in 62 games. That ended his career in the NHL, where he played 748 games over 12 seasons.

Monahan then went to Japan and played three seasons with Tokyo-based Seibu Tetsudo of the Japan Ice Hockey League, retiring after the 1981–82 season at age 35. Afterward, he spent several years working on Vancouver Canucks radio broadcasts.

Career statistics

External links 
 

1946 births
Living people
Canadian ice hockey centres
Detroit Red Wings players
Houston Apollos players
Los Angeles Kings players
Montreal Canadiens draft picks
Montreal Canadiens players
National Hockey League broadcasters
National Hockey League first-overall draft picks
National Hockey League first-round draft picks
Peterborough Petes (ice hockey) players
Toronto Maple Leafs players
Vancouver Canucks announcers
Vancouver Canucks players
Ice hockey people from Ontario
Sportspeople from Barrie